Halieutopsis okamurai, also known as Okamura's deepsea batfish, is a species of fish in the family Ogcocephalidae.

It is found in the waters of Southeastern Japan.

Etymology
This fish is named after the late Osamu Okamura (Professor Emeritus, BSKU), who collected the type specimen, and in recognition of his remarkable contributions to the study of deep-sea fishes, especially the gadiform fishes.

References

Ogcocephalidae
Marine fish genera
Fish described in 2022
Taxa named by Hans Hsuan-Ching Ho